Walter Law (March 26, 1876 – August 9, 1940) was an American actor. He appeared in 47 films between 1915 and 1936.

He was born in Dayton, Ohio, and died in Hollywood, California.

Filmography

References

External links

1876 births
1940 deaths
Male actors from Dayton, Ohio
American male film actors
American male silent film actors
20th-century American male actors